Acmonia is a genus of planthoppers in the family Fulgoridae, subfamily Poiocerinae. Species are distributed throughout Central America and South America.

Species
 Acmonia aegrota (Gerstaecker, 1860)
 Acmonia amabilis (Gerstaecker, 1860)
 Acmonia amoena (Gerstaecker, 1860)
 Acmonia carbonaria (Gerstaecker, 1860)
 Acmonia crowleyi Distant, 1906
 Acmonia dichroa (Germar, 1830)
 Acmonia ficta (Walker, 1858)
 Acmonia nigriceps Lallemand, 1960
 Acmonia procris Distant, 1887
 Acmonia punctata Lallemand, 1959
 Acmonia sanguinalis Distant, 1905
 Acmonia sanguinolenta (Blanchard, 1845)
 Acmonia sepulchralis (Stål, 1855)
 Acmonia spilota (Germar, 1830)
 Acmonia trivia Distant, 1887

References

Auchenorrhyncha genera
Poiocerinae